Carp River is the name of several rivers in the U.S. state of Michigan.

 Carp River (Gogebic-Ontonagon counties), in the Porcupine Mountains empties into Lake Superior at 
 Carp River (Luce County), empties into Lake Superior at  near the Crisp Point Light.
 Carp River (Mackinac County), a federally designated Wild and Scenic River in the Upper Peninsula flowing into St. Martin Bay on Lake Huron
 Carp River (Marquette County), empties into Lake Superior in Marquette at 
 Leland River, in Leelanau County, was formerly known as Carp River.
 Threemile Creek, in Luce County, was formerly known as Carp River.
 Waiska River, in Chippewa County, was formerly known as Carp River.
 The Marquette, Michigan post office was established on January 12, 1847 as Carp River. The name changed to Marquette on April 17, 1856.

See also 
 Carp Lake River
 Little Carp River

References

Rivers of Michigan
Set index articles on rivers of Michigan